Hossein Soroudi ( was an Iranian football and basketball player. He played for Iran national football team in 1951 Asian Games. He also competed in the men's basketball tournament at the 1948 Summer Olympics.

Club career
He previously played for the Taj from 1951–1954 and Nirooye Havaei from 1954–1955.

Honours
Iran
Asian Games Silver medal: 1951

References

External links

 Hossein Soroudi at TeamMelli.com

Iranian footballers
Presidents of Iranian Football Federation
Esteghlal F.C. players
Iranian men's basketball players
Asian Games bronze medalists for Iran
Asian Games silver medalists for Iran
Basketball players at the 1948 Summer Olympics
Olympic basketball players of Iran
Asian Games medalists in football
Footballers at the 1951 Asian Games
Asian Games medalists in basketball
Basketball players at the 1951 Asian Games
Medalists at the 1951 Asian Games
Association football defenders
Year of birth missing
Year of death missing
Iran international footballers